Korba is a city and an industrial area in Korba District in the Indian state of Chhattisgarh. Korba was erstwhile part of Bilaspur District before 25 May 1998 later that Korba was made a separate District for ease of administration but it is still under Bilaspur Division. Korba is called power capital of Chhattisgarh due to its Coal reserves and Industrial base for multiple thermal based power plants from Public sector like NTPC Limited, CSEB from State of Chhattisgarh as well as from private sector apart from Power plants Korba has the Asia's second largest and India's largest open cast coal mine in Gevra area of Korba Coalfield. Korba produces 140 Million tons of coal every year which accounts for 17% of Country's total coal production and 85% of Chhattisgarh Coal production.  BALCO Private owned Aluminium producer  has its smelter Aluminium Plant in Korba. Here mainly the protected tribal tribe Korwa (Pahadi Korwa) resides. Korba district is blessed by lush green forests from all around, a large population of tribals is found here. The tribals here prefer to live in harmony with the environment in the forest area due to which they have retained their distinctive cultural characteristics and traditional practices.

Geography
India census, Korba city had a population of 365,253. Korba City is a part of the Korba District which was formed on 25 May 1998. There are 17 police stations in Korba and it contains five blocks.

Economy
Korba Super Thermal Power Plant of NTPC is located at Jamanipali area. It receives coal from Gevra and Kusmunda mines and source of water for the power plant is Hasdeo River. Korba Thermal Power Station is owned and operated by National Thermal Power Corporation. There are more small Power Plant near city like Hasdeo Thermal Power Station, Dr Shyama Prasad Mukharjee Thermal Power Station and Lanco Amarkantak Power Plant.

Bharat Aluminium Company has plant which is one of the Asia's largest aluminium production industries. In 2009, chimney under construction by Gannon Dunkerley & Company at the Balco smelter collapsed killing 49 workers and GDCL management have been accused of negligence in the incident.

Government and jurisdiction 
Korba is headquarter of Korba district. Korba City has been a metropolitan municipality with a mayor-council form of government.

Korba (Lok Sabha constituency) is a Lok Sabha parliamentary constituency for the city and constituency is composed of the following assembly segments: Rampur (ST) (assembly constituency no. 20), Korba (assembly constituency no. 21), Katghora (assembly constituency no. 22) and Pali-Tanakhar (ST) (assembly constituency no. 23) is part of Korba district. Currently, Jyotsna Charan Das Mahant of Indian National Congress is a member of parliament to the 17th Lok Sabha and Jai Singh Agrawal of Indian National Congress sitting Member of the Legislative Assembly from Korba (Vidhan Sabha constituency).

Transport

Roadways 
Korba is well connected with the state and neighbouring states with a network of national and state highways. The major highways are National Highway 149B till Champa and National Highway 130 via Bilaspur till Raipur.

Rail
The nearest railway station Korba railway station, which is connected to Champa, which in turn lies on the Howrah-Nagpur-Mumbai line. The stations come under the South East Central Railway Zone of the Indian Railways. It is also directly connected to Bilaspur, the divisional headquarter of the railway zone.

Bus transport
Korba is well connected with a bus transport to various cities within and outside the state. Regular bus services are operated by the government and private operators from Korba Bus Station, the main bus station of the city, to cities like Bilaspur, Champa, Ambikapur, Raipur, Raigarh, Jharsuguda, Jamshedpur, Ranchi, Bhubaneswar, Nagpur, among others.

Air
Previously, the Government of Chhattisgarh was planning to expand and develop the airstrip present within the city premises.

Education

Schools
Delhi Public School NTPC Korba
Saraswati Higher Secondary School, Korba
DAV Public School, Gevra
DAV Public School, Kusmunda
DAV Public School,Subhash Block SECL COLONY,Korba
Jawahar Navodaya Vidyalaya, Korba
Govt. Hr. Sec. School, Chhindpur
Govt. Hr. Sec. School, Korba
New Era Progressive School, Korba
Jain Public School, Korba

College
Government Engineer Vishweshvaraya Post Graduate College
Government Minimata Girls College
Gramya Bharti Vidyapith, Hardi Bazar
Government Arts And Science College, Dipka
Government Polytechnic, Korba
Institute of Technology, Korba
Jyoti Bhushan Pratap Singh Law College, Korba
Kamla Nehru College, Korba

See also
 Satrenga
 Godhi, Korba
 List of cities in Chhattisgarh

References

External links

 

 
Cities and towns in Korba district
Mining communities in India